Röber or Roeber is a German surname. Notable people with the surname include:

Ernest Roeber (1861–1944), German-American professional wrestler
Mark Rober (born 1980), American YouTuber, engineer and inventor
Julius Röber, German entomologist
Jürgen Röber (born 1953), German footballer and manager
Rebecca Roeber (1958–2019), American politician
Richard Rober (1910-1952), American actor
Rick Roeber, American politician facing abuse allegations

German-language surnames